Discography: The Complete Singles Collection is the first greatest hits album by English synth-pop duo Pet Shop Boys, released on 4 November 1991 by Parlophone.

Composition
Discography collects all of the singles released by Pet Shop Boys up to 1991. 16 of the 18 tracks were singles, while the last two tracks ("DJ Culture" and "Was It Worth It?") are new songs recorded exclusively for this compilation. Discography also contains a non-album single: the duo's cover version of U2's song "Where the Streets Have No Name", which later in the song breaks into the chorus of Frankie Valli's "Can't Take My Eyes Off You". Although many of the album's songs were released in other forms, this compilation only features the seven-inch single versions.

Pet Shop Boys also released a companion video compilation, Videography, consisting of the music videos for each of the songs on Discography, arranged in a slightly different order. Additionally, the song "Was It Worth It?" was replaced with "How Can You Expect to Be Taken Seriously?", which was not on the audio version of the album, despite being a double A-side with "Where the Streets Have No Name (I Can't Take My Eyes off You)" (the exclusion being due to the constrictions of the CD's running time).

Critical reception

Upon its release, Andrew Collins of NME praised the compilation as "sublime and clever pop music" and added that you "don't have to despise rock music in order to love it". He added, "These songs are rooted in a distinctly bourgeois variety of urban angst but just think how closer it all is to your life than 'Vienna' and all that New Romantic nonsense to which the PSBs are so clearly indebted." Simon Price of Melody Maker summarised, "Somehow the lush symphonic sweep of these singles seems deeply cinematic. Every song is a full-scale Panavision epic whose recurrent moods are regret, nostalgia, and above all, jealousy. If you want near-faultless shimmering, shuddering disco melodrama, nobody does it better."

Track listing

Notes
  signifies an original producer
  signifies a remixer
  signifies an additional producer
  signifies an associate producer
 Tracks 1–4 are taken from Please (1986).
 Tracks 5–7 and 9 are taken from Actually (1987).
 Tracks 8 and 10–12 are taken from Introspective (1988).
 Tracks 13, 14 and 16 are taken from Behaviour (1990).
 Track 15 is a non-album single.
 Tracks 17 and 18 are previously unreleased.

Personnel
Credits adapted from the liner notes of Discography: The Complete Singles Collection.

Pet Shop Boys
 Neil Tennant
 Chris Lowe

Technical

 Stephen Hague – production ; remix ; additional production ; mixing 
 David Jacob – engineering ; original track production 
 J. J. Jeczalik – original recording production 
 Nicholas Froome – original recording production 
 Ron Dean Miller – New York overdubs 
 Julian Mendelsohn – production ; engineering ; mixing 
 Pet Shop Boys – production ; original track production ; associate production 
 Andy Richards – production 
 Tony Phillips – engineering 
 Lewis A. Martineé – production, engineering 
 Mike Couzzi – engineering 
 Trevor Horn – production 
 Stephen Lipson – production, engineering 
 Pete Schwier – engineering 
 Harold Faltermeyer – production 
 Brian Reeves – engineering 
 Bob Kraushaar – engineering 
 Ren Swan – engineering 
 Brothers in Rhythm – production 
 Paul Wright – engineering ; mixing 
 Nick Webb – mastering

Artwork
 Mark Farrow – design
 Rob Petrie – design
 3a – design
 PSB – design
 Eric Watson – main photographs, other photographs
 Peter Andreas – other photographs
 Michael Roberts – other photographs
 Douglas Brothers – other photographs
 Lawrence Watson – other photographs

Charts

Weekly charts

Year-end charts

Certifications

References

External links
 Discography: The Complete Singles Collection at PetShopBoys.co.uk

1991 greatest hits albums
Albums produced by Harold Faltermeyer
Albums produced by Julian Mendelsohn
Albums produced by Trevor Horn
Albums produced by Stephen Hague
Albums produced by Stephen Lipson
Parlophone compilation albums
Pet Shop Boys compilation albums